Alain Rey (born 7 July 1982) is a Swiss ski mountaineer.

Results (selection) 
 2005:
 9th European Championship vertical race
 1st, Trophée des Gastlosen, together with Reynold Ginier
 2006:
 3rd World Championship relay race together with Alexander Hug, Rico Elmer and Florent Troillet
 6th World Championship vertical race
 9th World Championship team race together with Yannick Ecoeur
 2007: 
 2nd European Championship relay race together with Florent Troillet, Yannick Ecoeur and Alexander Hug
 6th European Championship team race together wit Yannick Ecoeur
 8th, Trofeo Mezzalama (together with Yannick Ecoeur and Ernest Farquet)

Patrouille des Glaciers 

 2006: 5th (and 3rd in "seniors I" class ranking),together with Emmanuel Vaudan and Marcel Marti
 2008: 3rd ("seniors I" ranking), together with Sébastien Nicollier and Mathieu Chavoz
 2010: 9th ("military international" class ranking), together with Sébastien Nicollier and Mathieu Charvoz

Pierra Menta 

 2006: 8th together with Yannick Ecoeur
 2007: 6th together with Alexander Hug

External links 
 Alain Rey at skimountaineering.com

References 

Swiss male ski mountaineers
Swiss military patrol (sport) runners
1982 births
Living people